Sadayappa Vallal was a wealthy 12th-century velir (chief) who had his residence at both Puduvai (Puducherry) and Thiruvenainallur in India. He was known for his philanthropic activities. He was a close friend and a patron of Kambar, the Tamil poet who wrote Kamba Ramayanam (also known as Ramavataram). He was also associated closely with Pararajasingam, the king of Kandy, Ceylon.

Patronage of Kambar
Kambar had a number of patrons but Sadayappa Vallal was foremost among them. He attended the wedding of Kambar's son; according to one story, on seeing that all the seats were taken, took an unassuming position standing on the side of the ceremony. Kambar, in gratitude for Sadayappa Vallal's patronage and forbearance, lauded Sadayappa Vallal every 1000 stanzas in the Tamil epic Kamba Ramayanam.

According to tradition, Kambar's son, Ambikapathi was later put to death for having fallen in love with the Chola King's daughter and Kambar himself had to flee. In his old age, he was then supported and patronized by his friend Sadaiyappan.

King Pararajasingam
Sadayappa Vallal was also a close friend of king Pararajasingam of Kandy, Ceylon. When Kandy was hit by a famine, he immediately came to the aid of his friend by sending rice and other necessities in numerous ships. He is praised for this event as thus (loosely translated):

References

Further reading

12th-century Indian people
Indian philanthropists

Year of birth unknown
Year of death unknown